Marco André Baptista Freitas, known as Marco André (born 31 July 1987) is a Portuguese football player who plays for S.C. Freamunde.

Club career
He made his professional debut in the Segunda Liga for Desportivo das Aves on 13 September 2014 in a game against Leixões.

References

1987 births
Living people
People from Paços de Ferreira
Portuguese footballers
Rebordosa A.C. players
Gondomar S.C. players
F.C. Famalicão players
C.D. Aves players
Liga Portugal 2 players
AD Oliveirense players
AD Fafe players
F.C. Tirsense players
S.C. Freamunde players
Association football defenders
Sportspeople from Porto District